Kettle Creek is a creek in Elgin County in southwestern Ontario, Canada that empties into Lake Erie at Port Stanley. Dodd Creek is the major tributary. 

Kettle Creek flows through parts of London, Ontario and St. Thomas, Ontario. Most of the watershed is used for agriculture. During dry summers, water shortages can be experienced.  Kettle Creek adds a significant amount of phosphorus to Lake Erie.

Some of Ontario's rare remaining stands of Carolinian Forest are in the Kettle Creek watershed.

Gallery

See also  
List of rivers of Ontario

References

External links
Kettle Creek Conservation

Rivers of Elgin County